The OJSC Baltic Shipyard (Baltiysky Zavod, formerly Shipyard 189 named after Grigoriy Ordzhonikidze) is one of the oldest shipyards in Russia and is part of United Shipbuilding Corporation today.

It is located in Saint Petersburg in the south-western part of Vasilievsky Island. It is one of the three shipyards active in Saint Petersburg. Together with the Admiralty Shipyard it has been responsible for building many Imperial Russian battleships as well as Soviet nuclear-powered icebreakers. Currently it specializes in merchant ships while the Admiralty yard specializes in diesel-electric submarines. In addition, it is responsible for construction of Russian floating nuclear power stations.

History 
The shipyard was founded in 1856 by the St. Petersburg merchant M. Carr and the Scotsman Murdoch. L. MacPherson. It subsequently became the Carr and MacPherson yard. In 1864 it built two monitors of the Uragan class. In 1874 the shipyard was sold to Prince Ochtomski.

In 1934 the shipyard started work on the three prototypes for the S-class submarine, based on a German design produced by the Dutch company Ingenieurskantoor voor Scheepsbouw. The Soviets renamed the shipyard Zavod 189 'im. Sergo Ordzhonikidze' on 30 December 1936.

At the time of the collapse of Vladimir Vinogradov's Inkombank during the 1998 Financial crisis, Inkombank held a 16% stake in Baltic Shipyard.

XXI century 
Nowadays the shipyard manufactures warships, large tonnage cargo and ice-class vessels. As of 2021, it employs more than 6000 people. It has built more than 600 vessels.

In 2011 the shipyard came under control of JSC United Shipbuilding Corporation (USC), its vice-president Valery Venkov took the CEO post.

In the mid-2010s the shipyard launched a series of Project 22220, the largest and most powerful nuclear-powered ice-breakers designed to ensure year-round navigation in the western Arctic. In June 2016, nuclear icebreaker Arktika was launched. On September 22, 2017, Sibir was floated out. On May 25, 2019, the 173 metre-long nuclear-powered arctic ice breaker Ural had its ceremonial launch. The technical laying of the fourth vessel, named Yakutia, took place on May 26, 2020.

See also 
 Peresvet-class battleship
 Borodino-class battleship
 Borodino-class battlecruiser
 Andrei Pervozvanny-class battleship
 Gangut-class battleship
 Kronshtadt-class battlecruiser
 Sverdlov-class cruiser
 Russian battlecruiser Petr Velikiy
 Taimyr-class nuclear icebreaker
 Dekabrist-class submarine
 Baltijos Laivų Statykla in Lithuania
 Arktika-class icebreaker
 Admiralty Shipyard
 Severnaya Verf
 Russian floating nuclear power station

References

External links 
  
  
 Baltiysky Zavod JSC on Federation of American Scientists
 Baltic Shipyard on Nuclear Threat Initiative

Shipbuilding companies of the Soviet Union
Companies based in Saint Petersburg
1856 establishments in the Russian Empire
United Shipbuilding Corporation